Swanston Estates is a neighborhood situated in North Sacramento, California. It is bordered by Arden Way on the south, Ethan Way on the East, Business 80 on the west, and El Camino Avenue on the north. This area lies behind the Arden Fair Mall. The zip code for the neighborhood is 95815.

Founding residents Nicholas and Henrietta Gosselink established Hope Community Church (now Emmanuel) on Ethan Way. The uncle of another contributed the land for D.W. Babcock Elementary School and Park.

Swanston Estates is named for the Swanston family, which owned a  cattle ranch and a meatpacking plant located at the Southern Pacific tracks from 1914 until the 1940s. The family sold much of the land to the state of California in the late 1940s, which intended to build Cal Expo there. The state didn't use all of the land for that purpose and sold the unused land in 1970 for $7.3 million, at which point it saw commercial and residential development.

References

External links
http://www.cityofsacramento.org/ns/nadb/org.cfm?orgid=204
https://www.sacbee.com/news/local/education/article87880797.html

Neighborhoods in Sacramento, California